Jared Solomon (born June 10, 1997) is an American professional baseball pitcher in the Cincinnati Reds organization. He made his MLB debut in 2022.

Amateur career
Solomon attended Millville Area Junior Senior High School in Millville, Pennsylvania and played college baseball at Alderson Broaddus University and Lackawanna College. He was drafted by the Cincinnati Reds in the 11th round of the 2017 Major League Baseball draft.

Professional career
Solomon signed with the Reds and made his professional debut with the Arizona League Reds, going 2-2 with a 4.26 ERA over 38 innings. In 2018, he pitched with both the Billings Mustangs and the Dayton Dragons, starting 15 games between both teams and compiling a 4-3 record and 3.34 ERA over  innings. Solomon split the 2019 season between Dayton and the Daytona Tortugas and went 3-11 with a 3.98 ERA and 111 strikeouts over 26 starts and  innings. He did not play a minor league game in 2020 due to the cancellation of the minor league season caused by the pandemic.  The Reds added Solomon to their 40-man roster after the 2020 season. He did not play a game in 2021 after undergoing Tommy John surgery.

On May 7, 2022, Solomon's contract was selected to the active roster. He made his MLB debut that night, throwing a scoreless inning in relief. On November 15, Solomon was designated for assignment. On November 18, he was non tendered and became a free agent. On December 6, Solomon resigned with the Reds to a minor league deal.

References

External links

1997 births
Living people
Alderson Broaddus Battlers baseball players
Arizona League Reds players
Baseball players from Pennsylvania
Billings Mustangs players
Chattanooga Lookouts players
Cincinnati Reds players
Dayton Dragons players
Daytona Tortugas players
Lackawanna Falcons baseball players
Louisville Bats players
Major League Baseball pitchers
People from Millville, Pennsylvania
St. Cloud Rox players
Utica Blue Sox players